This is a list of programs that are currently, have been, or are soon to be broadcast on The CW. Some programs were broadcast on UPN and The WB and were moved to the CW when the networks ceased broadcasting.

Current programming

Drama

Unscripted

Docuseries

Reality

Variety

Continuations

Sports programming

Acquired programming

Children's programming

Upcoming programming

Unscripted

Continuations

Acquired programming

In development

Former programming

Dramas

Comedies

Reality/non-scripted programming

Acquired programming

Daytime

Children's programming

See also
 List of programs broadcast by The CW Plus – for programs aired by The CW's national programming feed for smaller markets
 CW Seed — for information about The CW's digital platform

Notes

References

External links
 

 
Cw